Moriles is a town in the province of Córdoba (Andalusia, Spain). In 2018 it had a population of 3,726. The municipality covers an area of about 20 km2 and has a population density of about 194 inhabitants/km2. The town is located about 65 km south of the provincial capital, Córdoba, at an altitude of 375 m above sea level, at co-ordinates .

It is known for its olive oil and fortified sherry-like wines known as Montilla-Moriles.

References

Municipalities in the Province of Córdoba (Spain)